Allu  is a Telugu surname. Notable people with this surname include:
 
 Allu Aravind (born 1949), Telugu film producer 
 Allu Arjun (born 1983), Telugu film actor 
 Allu Sirish (born 1985), Telugu film actor 
 Allu Ramalingaiah, Telugu film actor

Telugu-language surnames